Kaja Kamp Nielsen (born 29 April 1994) is a Danish handball player for Team Esbjerg and the Danish national team.

She was selected as part of the Danish 35-player squad for the 2020 European Women's Handball Championship.

References

1994 births
Living people
Danish female handball players
People from Rebild Municipality
Sportspeople from the North Jutland Region